General Mohammad Qassim Jangulbagh was the provincial police chief in Nuristān Province of Afghanistan, as of November 2009.

References

Living people
Year of birth missing (living people)
Place of birth missing (living people)
People from Nuristan Province